Ocampo is one of the 38 municipalities of Coahuila, in north-eastern Mexico, and the largest by area. The municipal seat lies at Ocampo. The municipality covers an area of 26,433 km² and is located on the international border between Mexico and the USA, here formed by the Río Bravo del Norte (Rio Grande), adjacent to the U.S. state of Texas.

In 2010, the municipality had a total population of 10,991.

Towns and villages

The largest localities (cities, towns, and villages) are:

Adjacent municipalities and counties

 Acuña Municipality - northeast
 Múzquiz Municipality - northeast
 San Buenaventura Municipality - east
 Nadadores Municipality - southeast
 Lamadrid Municipality - southeast
 Cuatrociénegas Municipality - south
 Sierra Mojada Municipality - west
 Camargo Municipality, Chihuahua - west
 Manuel Benavides Municipality, Chihuahua - northwest
 Brewster County, Texas - north

References

Municipalities of Coahuila
Coahuila populated places on the Rio Grande